Rami Library is a public library established in 2023 housed in the redeveloped 18th-century Rami Barracks in Istanbul, Turkey.

See also 
List of libraries in Istanbul

References 

Public libraries in Turkey
Libraries in Istanbul
Redevelopment projects in Istanbul
Libraries established in 2023
2023 establishments in Turkey
Eyüp